Eleshnitsa is a village in Elin Pelin Municipality, in Sofia Province, Bulgaria.

Geography
Eleshnitsa is located in a mountainous area in the foothills of the Balkan Mountains, at the foot of Mount Murgash 25 km northeast of Sofia and 10 km north of Elin Pelin. The Eleshnitsa River springs near Mount Murgash and passes through Eleshnitsa. The old road from Sofia to Botevgrad and the Hemus motorway are in the immediate vicinity.

History
From 1959 to 1991 the village was named Yordankino.

Cultural and natural attractions
The Eleshnitsa Monastery is near the village.

References

Villages in Sofia Province